Fighting Vipers (ファイティングバイパーズ Faitingu Vaipāzu) is a 3D fighting video game developed by Sega AM2. It uses the same game engine as AM2's Virtua Fighter 2 but features enclosed arenas and an armor mechanic, and was targeted more towards Western audiences, using a U.S. setting and more freeform styles of martial arts. The game was released in the arcade in 1995 using the Sega Model 2 hardware. The game was ported to the Sega Saturn, and to PlayStation Network and Xbox Live Arcade in 2012. Though Fighting Vipers was not very popular in North American arcades, the Saturn version was one of the most high-profile games in the system's 1996 holiday lineup, and was met with positive reviews.

Gameplay
Fighting Vipers features a similar style of gameplay to Sega AM2's more renowned Virtua Fighter series, specifically Virtua Fighter 2, using simply guard, punch and kick attack buttons with a focus on combo moves. The Saturn version uses its three extra buttons for three smaller combos.

Each of the 9 characters featured in the game wears armor that can be broken off by opponents, leaving them more vulnerable to taking damage. A human shaped meter in the top corners of the screen monitors damage to the armor. Walls surround each arena, caging the combatants in, allowing for attacks in conjunction with them (bouncing off etc.). If a knockout attack is strong enough, characters can knock their opponent over, on top, or straight through the walls.

The Saturn port of Fighting Vipers added Playback Mode and Training Mode, both of which are now used widely in the genre, by games such as Tekken and Soulcalibur. Players could save their matches and play them again in Playback Mode, while Training Mode talked the player through the moves of each character one-by-one.

Characters
Bahn: despite only being a 17-year-old high school student from Nishino Machi, Bahn is a powerful and imposing fighter in a long coat and hat. He has come overseas to find and fight his father, whom he has never met and abandoned him and his mother when he was a boy. He has declared himself 'Gengis Bahn III'.

Candy (or Honey): a petite 16-year-old fashion student with a pleasant nature, Candy designed her own trademark plastic fairy costume herself, and has entered the tournament to promote her original fashion line. Takara, a Japanese toy company, made three dolls of this character.

Grace: a 19-year-old African-American born in Armstone City whose armor is themed after the protective gear for inline skating, including the skates themselves. Grace is making her living as a fashion model. Though she once dreamed of becoming a professional figure skater, her lover and coach betrayed her, leaving her disillusioned.

Raxel: the narcissistic lead singer and guitarist for a hair metal band called 'Death Crunch' with KISS-styled armor and carrying a red Gibson Flying-V electric guitar, Raxel is the son of an Armstone City councilman, a drop out who left home after a fight with his father. Raxel has simply entered the tournament to heighten his own profile and become more famous.

Tokio: a 16-year-old pretty boy rebelling against a strict kabuki actor's household. Tokio is a former leader of a street gang called 'Black Thunder' but left after feeling responsible for another gang member's death. He has entered the tournament for a challenge and for thrills.

Sanman: a mysterious fat man about whom nothing is known, other than his birthday (3 March) and an obsession with the number 3, hence his name (san is Japanese for "three"). Sanman drives a large customized scooter.

Jane: a butch and muscled 18-year-old part-time construction worker, Jane trained her whole life to join the Navy, but did not make it past training. She was discharged after repeatedly losing control of herself during fights and injuring fellow seamen. Jane now wants to test just how tough she is, hence entering the Fighting Vipers tournament.

Picky: a 14-year-old stereotypical skateboarder Picky's armor is styled after protective gear for skateboarders. He carries his skateboard on his back, and hits opponents with it. Picky began skateboarding to impress his first love, but later on he left her for Candy.

Mahler: the unlockable ninth character, Mahler is a mysterious 20-year-old with a grudge against the Mayor of Armstone City (who has organised the tournament) wearing poisonous armor resembling a snake. He isn't officially registered as a member of the tournament.

B.M.: the boss of the game and the man who organised the tournament, B.M. is a powered-up version of Mahler. Both Mahler and B.M.'s names may have been inspired by musician Samuel Coleridge-Taylor, who was known in America as the "Big Mahler".

Kumachan: a 10-year-old smiling bear character wearing an orange hat, who is included as an unlockable character in the Sega Saturn port. It is based on the giant floating balloon mascot seen in the Old Armstone Town stage. It uses Sanman's fighting style, and its 2nd player counterpart is called Pandachan. Even though it can fight, its 3D model never moves.

Pepsiman: the Japanese mascot of Pepsi who only appears in the Japanese Sega Saturn version of the game as an unlockable character. He was removed from the US and PAL releases.

Development
Fighting Vipers was developed using the same game engine which was first used for Virtua Fighter 2, and uses a nearly identical arcade board, though with slightly faster processing speed. Unlike Virtua Fighter 2, there are no ring-outs; producer Yu Suzuki stated, "We received comments about the ring-outs in VF  and so for FV the fighting can continue mercilessly."

The character Mahler was created by reducing the power specifications of the boss, B.M., so that he would be appropriately balanced for player vs. player matches.

A demo of the game was displayed at the 1995 JAMMA show with all eight characters playable, though they did not yet have all their moves available.

The Saturn conversion, like the arcade original, was developed by Sega AM2. The programming team consisted of 15 people, most of whom had worked on the Saturn version of Virtua Fighter 2, and some of whom had worked on the arcade version of Fighting Vipers. Work on the conversion began in the first quarter of 1996 and took eight months. After converting the Virtua Fighter 2 engine, the team focused first on recreating the barriers, as they anticipated this would be the most difficult part to accomplish on the Saturn hardware. Because armor and walls can be broken in the game, there was no easy way of reducing the number of polygons in those elements. In part to compensate for the lower polygon counts on the characters, a new form of dynamic lighting incorporating Gouraud shading was added to the Saturn version. In order to make this effect possible, and have the game run at a speed comparable to the arcade version, the team decided at the beginning of development that they would not use the Saturn's high-resolution mode.

Regional differences

The original Japanese version had a large amount of advertising for Pepsi, due to product placement agreements with Sega at the time.  This licensing was removed in the US and PAL versions.
In the US and PAL versions, Honey has been renamed as Candy.

Reception

In Japan, Game Machine listed Fighting Vipers on their December 15, 1995 issue as being the most popular arcade game at the time. It went on to be one of the top five highest-grossing arcade printed circuit board (PCB) software of 1996 in Japan. It was considerably less popular in North American arcades.

Reviewing the arcade version, Next Generation called Fighting Vipers "a beautiful, highly polished, polygon-rendered and texture-mapped game featuring brand new characters, unprecedented closed-in arenas (for a 3D fighter), a slightly different set of fighting strategies using armor, and a more cinematic style of viewing." The reviewer also praised the more intuitive button combinations used to execute moves. Despite this, he concluded that the game fails to measure up to recent fighting games, chiefly due to the "strained" character designs: "Raxel, Jane, Picky, Sanman are undeniably trendy and conclusively uncool ... They lack the artful, graceful movements of VF2s Lau, Sarah, or Pai."

In reviews for the Saturn version, the barrier mechanics - allowing players to beat opponents against or through walls and use them to launch attacks - were met with universal approval. Most were also enthusiastic about being able to break off an opponent's armor for extra damage, though Crispin Boyer and Sushi-X of Electronic Gaming Monthly felt the amount of flesh exposed when a fighter's armor is broken off amounted to cheap lewdness. While some complained of reduced polygon counts and occasional slowdown compared to the arcade version, the conversion to the Saturn as a whole was well-regarded, with critics especially praising its retention of the arcade version's smooth animation, its use of light sourcing, and the Saturn-exclusive features. GameSpot concluded, "If you have a Saturn, this is the fighting game to own. If you don't, Fighting Vipers gives you a good reason to get one." GamePro said it "is one of our favorites because it's fast, sexy, and easy." And while most critics felt that Fighting Vipers clearly falls short of Virtua Fighter 2, Rich Leadbetter of Sega Saturn Magazine said it "is far more of a gratifying experience to the average gamer than VF or its sequel" and a Next Generation reviewer concluded, "VF2 is one of the best games of all time, but Fighting Vipers nearly eclipses it."

Sequels and re-releases
A sequel, Fighting Vipers 2 was released, introducing new characters. It was ported to the Dreamcast but only in Japan and Europe.

All of the Fighting Vipers characters were used in Sega AM2's Fighters Megamix for the Sega Saturn. Fighting Vipers was also re-released for the PlayStation 2 as part of the Sega Ages line. A PAL version was planned, but never released.

Fighting Vipers was re-released in late 2012 on PlayStation Network and Xbox Live as one of five games included in the Sega Model 2 Collection. The re-release features online play, but does not contain any of the extra content found in the Saturn version. Fighting Vipers is also included as a playable arcade game in Judgment and Lost Judgment.

Bahn appears as a solo unit in Project X Zone, an 3DS' RPG crossover of Capcom, Sega and Namco Bandai Games.

Sonic the Fighters

A programmer working on Fighting Vipers put Sonic the Hedgehog and Tails in the game for amusement, which led to Sega AM2 commissioning a Sonic fighting game, Sonic the Fighters. Hidden within the data of the arcade version of Sonic the Fighters is an additional character named Honey, a yellow cat wearing Candy's red plastic fairy costume. She is only playable by hacking the game's data. Honey's model was removed from the Sonic the Fighters port on Sonic Gems Collection. However, in the Xbox 360 and PlayStation 3 port, she is a playable character, and was later introduced to the cast of Archie Comics' Sonic the Hedgehog comics during an arc based on Sonic the Fighters. The arc depicts Honey as a fashion designer similar to her human counterpart, and also features a boar character based on Jane.

References

External links

1995 video games
3D fighting games
Arcade video games
Fighting games
Multiplayer and single-player video games
PlayStation 2 games
PlayStation Network games
Sega arcade games
Sega Games franchises
Sega Saturn games
Sega video games
Sega-AM2 games
Video games designed by Yu Suzuki
Video games developed in Japan
Xbox 360 Live Arcade games